The 2015 Mongolian 1st League also known as the Khurkhree National 1st League is the 1st tournament of the League.

Football competitions in Mongolia